The Blank Slate Monument (officially called Blank Slate: Hope for a New America) is a monument by Ghanaian artist Kwame Akoto-Bamfo. The work has been described as "a visual representation of the evolution of the Black experience and struggle in America, as well as a tribute to African American history".

References

External links
 

Monuments and memorials in the United States
Sculptures of African Americans
Statues in the United States